Martin Friis (born 18 November 1965) is a Norwegian former ice hockey player. He was born in Oslo, Norway. He played for the Norwegian national ice hockey team at the 1992 Winter Olympics.

References

External links

1965 births
Living people
Ice hockey players at the 1992 Winter Olympics
Norwegian ice hockey players
Olympic ice hockey players of Norway
Ice hockey people from Oslo
Stjernen Hockey players